Natalia Vitaliyevna Vinogradova (born 14 July 1993) is a Russian sport shooter. She represented Russia at the 2020 Summer Olympics in Tokyo, where she took part in the skeet event, qualifiying to the finals, where she finished sixth.

References

1993 births
Living people
Russian female sport shooters
Shooters at the 2020 Summer Olympics
Olympic shooters of Russia
Sportspeople from Moscow
21st-century Russian women